Leawood Elementary School is the name of several schools, including:

Leawood Elementary School (Colorado)
Leawood Elementary School (Kansas)